Reeder Township is a township in Anderson County, Kansas, United States. As of the 2010 census, its population was 452.

History
Reeder Township was established in 1857. It was named for Andrew Horatio Reeder, first Territorial Governor of Kansas.

Geography
According to the USGS, it contains four cemeteries: Baird, Bethel, Central City and Patton.

The streams of Elm Creek, Kenoma Creek, Rocky Run and Thomas Creek run through this township.

Transportation
Reeder Township contains two airports or landing strips: Graham Farms Airport and Graham Farms Auxiliary Airport.

References
 USGS Geographic Names Information System (GNIS)

External links
 US-Counties.com
 City-Data.com

Townships in Anderson County, Kansas
Townships in Kansas
1857 establishments in Kansas Territory